This is a list of Bien de Interés Cultural landmarks in the Province of Murcia, Spain.

 Despeñaperros Castle
 IES Licenciado Francisco Cascales
 Murcia Cathedral

References 

Murcia